Monte Cerignone is a comune (municipality) in the Province of Pesaro e Urbino in the Italian region Marche, located about  northwest of Ancona and about  west of Pesaro.

Monte Cerignone borders the following municipalities: Macerata Feltria, Mercatino Conca, Montecopiolo, Monte Grimano, Sassocorvaro Auditore, Tavoleto.

Sights include   the Malatesta fortress, which was partly designed by Francesco di Giorgio Martini.

The town has the head office of the coffeeshop chain Caffè Pascucci.

Twin towns
 Randazzo, Italy

References

 

Cities and towns in the Marche
Castles in Italy